Yeatman is a surname. Notable people with the surname include:

Bill Yeatman (1839–1901), baseball player for the Washington Nationals of the National Association in 1872
Eric Morgan Yeatman, English engineer
Hoyt Yeatman (born 1955), visual effects artist and supervisor
Huyshe Yeatman-Biggs (1845–1922), influential Anglican clergyman who served as the only Suffragan Bishop of Southwark
John Pym Yeatman (1830–1910), barrister and influential proponent of British Israelism
R. J. Yeatman (1897–1968), British humorist who wrote for Punch
Rex Yeatman (1919–1995), English cricketer who had a brief first class cricket career for the Surrey First XI
Will Yeatman (born 1988), American football tight end for the Miami Dolphins of the National Football League
James E. Yeatman (1818–1901), a bank founder and philanthropist from St. Louis, Missouri.

See also
Taylor, Fladgate, & Yeatman (often simply Taylor Fladgate), one of the largest port wine houses

English-language surnames